Allocasuarina media is a shrub of the genus Allocasuarina native to Victoria.

The species is confined to a small area along the southern coast of Victoria.

References

External links
  Occurrence data for Allocasuarina media from The Australasian Virtual Herbarium

media
Flora of Victoria (Australia)
Fagales of Australia